Lu Rong (1436–1494) was a Chinese scholar. He is also known under the courtesy name Wenliang (文量) and the pseudonym Shizhai (式斋).

He earned his jinshi degree in 1466. His best-known work is Shuyuan Zaji (椒园杂记), whose title has been translated as  Random jottings from bean garden, Miscellaneous notes in the bean garden, or Miscellaneous records from the bean garden.

External links
Lu, R. (2022). A Ming Confucian’s World: Selections from Miscellaneous Records from the Bean Garden (M. Halperin, Trans.). University of Washington Press. http://www.jstor.org/stable/j.ctv2n4w5w9 (CC BY-NC-ND 4.0)

1436 births
1494 deaths
Ming dynasty scholars